Events in the year 1963 in the Republic of India.

Incumbents
 President of India – Sarvepalli Radhakrishnan
 Prime Minister of India – Jawaharlal Nehru
 Chief Justice of India – Bhuvaneshwar Prasad Sinha

Governors
 Andhra Pradesh – Satyawant Mallannah Shrinagesh 
 Assam – Saiyid Fazal Ali
 Bihar – Vishnu Sahay 
 Gujarat – Mehdi Nawaz Jung
 Karnataka – Jayachamarajendra Wadiyar (until 4 May), S. M. Shrinagesh (starting 4 May)
 Kerala – V. V. Giri 
 Madhya Pradesh – Hari Vinayak Pataskar
 Maharashtra – Vijaya Lakshmi Pandit 
 Nagaland – Vishnu Sahay (starting 1 December)
 Odisha – Ajudhia Nath Khosla 
 Punjab – Pattom A. Thanu Pillai 
 Rajasthan –  Sampurnanand 
 Uttar Pradesh – Bishwanath Das 
 West Bengal – Padmaja Naidu

Events
 National income - 230,580 million
 November 21 - India's first ever rocket launch was carried out at Thumba Equatorial Rocket Launching Station Thiruvananthapuram. The launch was successful and it sent NASA-made Nike-Apache rocket to space. 
 December 27 - Theft of the Holy Relic from the Hazratbal Shrine 
 Indo Swizz project started at Kerala for developing new cattle breed.

Law
 Supreme Court of India mandates that reservation should not exceed 50% for any institution.

Births
29 April – Deepika Chikhalia, actress.
25 May – Gajendra Pal Singh Raghava, scientist.
2 June – Anand Abhyankar, Marathi Actor. (d.2012)
16 June – Irai Anbu, Indian Administrative Service.
27 July  K. S. Chithra, playback singer. 
30 July – Abhijith, actor.
10 August – Phoolan Devi, bandit turned politician, assassinated (d.2001).
13 August – Sridevi, Actress. (d.2018)
17 August – S. Shankar, film director.
27 August  Sumalatha, actress. 
20 October – Navjot Singh Sidhu, Indian opening batsman.
4 December – Jaaved Jaaferi, actor.
25 December – Raju Srivastav, comedian, actor and politician. (d.2022)

Full date unknown
Keshava Malagi, writer.

Deaths
13 April – Babu Gulabrai, writer and historian (b. 1888).
30 30 October - U. Muthuramalingam Thevar, Indian Freedom Fighter, Orator, Politician (b. 1908).
24 November – Marotrao Kannamvar, Politician, 2nd Chief Minister of Maharashtra.
2 December – Sabu Dastagir, actor (b. 1924).

Full date unknown
Amar Nath Kak, lawyer and author (b. 1889).

See also 
 Bollywood films of 1963

References

 
India
Years of the 20th century in India